Maksim Tsyhalka (often spelled Maxim Tsigalko; 27 May 1983 – 25 December 2020) was a Belarusian football player. He ended his professional career early (at the age of 26) in 2010 due to persistent injuries.

Career 
He began his playing career at a youth team Dinamo-Yuni Minsk  before moving up to play for the Dinamo Minsk first team, he spent 5 years with the club before moving to fellow Belarus team Naftan Novopolotsk, after an unsuccessful 2 seasons there Tsyhalka soon moved on to Kazakhstan club Kaisar Kyzylorda. Tsyhalka spent 2 seasons with the club before moving in the summer of 2008 to Armenian team Banants Yerevan, where he would spend only a short stint. He spent the rest of the season for now-defunct Belarus club Savit Mogilev. He scored 2 goals in his short spell at the club before being released after Savit was relegated and dissolved.

International goals

Honours
Dinamo Minsk
Belarusian Premier League champion: 2004
Belarusian Cup winner: 2002–03

In popular culture 
Maksim and, to a lesser extent, his brother Yuri both achieved a small amount of fame and worldwide renown after they were featured in the Championship Manager / Football Manager computer game series by Sports Interactive, especially in CM 01/02.  Both players were present in the database with good starting stats and a very high potential, and Maksim (spelled "Maxim Tsigalko" in the game) in particular was capable of becoming a world class player, to the degree that he is very well known amongst fans of the Football Manager series and considered one of the game's legends.

Personal life
Tsyhalka also had a twin brother Yury who played as a goalkeeper. The brothers played alongside each other at Dinamo Minsk.

Death
Maksim Tsyhalka died on 25 December 2020 at the age of 37.

References

External links
 

1983 births
2020 deaths
Footballers from Minsk
Association football forwards
Belarusian footballers
Belarus international footballers
Belarus under-21 international footballers
FC Dinamo Minsk players
FC Dinamo-Juni Minsk players
FC Naftan Novopolotsk players
FC Kaisar players
FC Urartu players
FC Savit Mogilev players
Belarusian expatriate footballers
Expatriate footballers in Kazakhstan
Expatriate footballers in Armenia
Belarusian expatriate sportspeople in Kazakhstan
Belarusian Premier League players
Armenian Premier League players
Kazakhstan Premier League players
Belarusian twins
Twin sportspeople